Psychotria cathetoneura is a species of plant in the family Rubiaceae. It is endemic to Cuba.

References

Flora of Cuba
cathetoneura
Vulnerable plants
Taxonomy articles created by Polbot